Statistics of Division 2 in the 1938–39 season.

Overview
It was contested by 23 teams, and Red Star Paris won the championship.

League standings

References
France - List of final tables (RSSSF)

Ligue 2 seasons
France
2